Maliarpha rosella is a species of snout moth in the genus Maliarpha. It was described by George Hampson in 1896 and is known from India (including Nilgiris, the type location).

References

Moths described in 1896
Anerastiini